Tetracoccus ilicifolius is a rare species of flowering shrub in the family Picrodendraceae known by the common names hollybush and holly-leaved tetracoccus.

It was described by botanists Frederick Vernon Coville and Marshall French Gilman in 1936. They had participated with other eminent biologists in the 1891 Death Valley Expedition funded by Congress.

Distribution
The plant is endemic to California, found in only several Mojave Desert mountain ranges within Death Valley National Park, in eastern Inyo County.

There are fewer than ten occurrences, and it is a NatureServe listed Critically endangered species.

Description
Tetracoccus ilicifolius is a branching shrub, hairless in texture except for the new twigs, which have woolly brownish hairs. The shiny, leathery leaves are oppositely arranged or borne in whorls along the branches. Each leaf is oval with a toothed margin and measures 1.5 to 3 centimeters long.

The plant is dioecious, with male and female individuals producing different types of flowers. The staminate flowers occur in dense clusters, each flower with 7 to 9 lance-shaped sepals and 7 to 9 stamens. The pistillate flower occurs singly. The bloom period is May and June.

It produces a rounded, woolly brown fruit with usually four chambers. The fruit is around a centimeter long when mature and contains one or two seeds per chamber.

See also

References

External links
  Calflora Database: Tetracoccus ilicifolius (Holly leaved tetracoccus,  Hollybush)
 Jepson Manual eFlora (TJM2) treatment
 UC CalPhotos gallery

Picrodendraceae
Endemic flora of California
Flora of the California desert regions
Natural history of the Mojave Desert
Natural history of Inyo County, California
Death Valley National Park
Panamint Range
Plants described in 1936
Critically endangered flora of California